This is a list of members of the South Australian Legislative Council from 1975 to 1979.

This period operated under transitional arrangements following the rearrangement of the Council from a restricted-franchise house with ten provinces each electing two members, to a 22-member house elected to staggered terms on an open franchise, proportional representation model. Due in part to a constitutional requirement that those elected at the 1973 election serve six-year terms, the next Council election was in 1979 even though the next Assembly election was held in 1977.

 Liberal MLC Frank Potter died on 26 February 1978. Trevor Griffin was appointed to the resulting casual vacancy on 7 March 1978.

References

 "Statistical Record of the Legislature, 1837–2007", Parliament of South Australia, 2007.
 "History of South Australian Elections, 1857–2006", Dean Jaensch, 2006.

Members of South Australian parliaments by term
20th-century Australian politicians